Piz Alpetta (2,764 m) is a mountain of the Glarus Alps, located near Disentis in the canton of Graubünden. It lies at the eastern end of the chain east of Piz Cavardiras, between the Val Russein and the main Rhine valley.

References

External links
 Piz Alpetta on Hikr

Mountains of the Alps
Mountains of Switzerland
Mountains of Graubünden
Two-thousanders of Switzerland
Disentis